Surveyor is an unincorporated community in Clearfield County, in the U.S. state of Pennsylvania.

History

The community takes its name from nearby Surveyor Run.

References

Unincorporated communities in Pennsylvania
Unincorporated communities in Clearfield County, Pennsylvania